Tangerhütte-Land was a Verwaltungsgemeinschaft ("collective municipality") in the district of Stendal, in Saxony-Anhalt, Germany. The seat of the Verwaltungsgemeinschaft was in Tangerhütte. It was disbanded in May 2010.

The Verwaltungsgemeinschaft Tangerhütte-Land consisted of the following municipalities:

Former Verwaltungsgemeinschaften in Saxony-Anhalt